The first edition of Glamanand Supermodel India contest was held on November 4, 2015 at Courtyard Marriott in New Delhi. 21 year old model Aaital Khosla from Chandigarh was declared Glamanand Supermodel India 2015 carrying the title Miss Earth India 2015 at the conclusion of the event. Vaishnavi Patwardhan was declared 1st Runner Up and Jolly Rathod was crowned 2nd Runner Up.

Aaital Khosla represented India at Miss Earth 2015 pageant held on December 5, 2015 in the Vienna, Austria.

Final Result

Notes
 Supriya Aiman was appointed by Glamanand organization to represent India at Miss International 2015 pageant as the national contest was held after the conclusion of Miss International 2015 in Japan.

Returns and Crossovers

Femina Miss India Delhi
2015 - Aaital Khosla
2015 - Monali Chaudary
Femina Miss India Kolkata
2015 - Namrata Sharma
 Indian Princess
2015 - Himani Sharma  (Best Walk) 
2012 - Monali Chaudary (Indian Princess Tourism Queen International of the Year 2012)
  Miss Tourism International 
2014 - Rashmi Rajput  (Top 10 , Miss Photogenic , Miss KL Sogo Trendsetter)
  Miss Tourism Queen International of the Year 
2012 - Monali Chaudary  (Top 20)

References

Miss Earth India
2015 beauty pageants in India